The Sarasaviya Best Actress Award is presented annually by the weekly Sarasaviya newspaper in collaboration with the Associated Newspapers of Ceylon Limited at the Sarasaviya Awards Festival.

The award was first given in 1964. Frequent winners include Swarna Mallawarachchi (5), Anoja Weerasinghe (4) and Geetha Kumarasinghe (4).

Following is a list of the winners of this prestigious title since then.

References

Actress
Film awards for lead actress
Awards established in 1964
1964 establishments in Ceylon